Manuel Alejandro Correa Galán (born 6 March 1993) is a Mexican professional footballer who plays for Inter Playa del Carmen. He was born in Guadalajara, Jalisco.

External links
 
 

1993 births
Living people
Mexican footballers
Association football midfielders
Atlas F.C. footballers
Inter Playa del Carmen players
Liga MX players
Footballers from Guadalajara, Jalisco